Inishowen East, also called East Inishowen or Innishowen East, is a barony in County Donegal, Republic of Ireland. Baronies were mainly cadastral rather than administrative units. They acquired modest local taxation and spending functions in the 19th century before being superseded by the Local Government (Ireland) Act 1898.

Etymology
Inishowen East takes its name from Inishowen, in Irish Inis Eoghain, "Eoghan's island [peninsula]", referring to Eógan mac Néill, a semi-legendary king of the 5th century AD and ancestor of the Cenél nEógain dynasty.

Geography

Inishowen East is located in the northeast of the Inishowen Peninsula.

History

Inishowen East was once part of the ancient kingdom of Moy Ith. Inishowen was originally a single barony but was divided in the 1830s into West and East.

List of settlements

Below is a list of settlements in Inishowen East:
Ballyliffin
Carndonagh 
Clonmany
Culdaff
Greencastle
Malin
Moville
Shrove

References

Baronies of County Donegal